Prelude and Fugue in B minor, BWV 544 is a piece of organ music written by Johann Sebastian Bach sometime between 1727 and 1731, during his tenure in Leipzig. Unlike most other organ preludes and fugues of Bach, the autograph fair copy of the score survives.

History
Because of the deeply melancholic nature, the B minor affekt, and musical elements of the work, its respective movements are believed by some to have been performed as a prelude and postlude alongside the B minor Cantata Laß, Fürstin, laß noch einen Strahl, BWV 198, which was performed on 17 October 1727 at the University Church in Leipzig as a funeral ode for Christiane Eberhardine, wife of August II the Strong, the Elector of Saxony and King of Poland. The autograph manuscript, along with that of the Prelude and Fugue in E minor, BWV 548, which is believed to have been written around the same time, share the same watermark and style of handwriting, which points to a composition period of 1727-1731.

Composition

Prelude
Tightly woven 32nd note scales, suspensions, dramatic octave pedal effects, tension-building through repetition, and appoggiatura harmonies characterize this movement. The opening theme is followed by contrasting fugal episodes. The complex ritornello structure of this prelude makes the work structurally similar to that of other mature organ works, such as the BWV 548 and BWV 546 preludes.

Fugue
The 4/4 fugue is more restrained compared to the 6/8 prelude, containing a relatively straightforward subject that moves in single note steps up and down the B minor scale.

Arrangements

Piano transcriptions
The piece has been included in Franz Liszt's transcriptions of Bach's six "Great" organ Preludes and Fugues, BWV 543 - 548, for solo piano (S. 462). The piece was also transcribed by Ivan Karlovitsch Tscherlitzky.

References

Work Cited
Williams, Peter (2003), The Organ Music of J. S. Bach (2nd ed.), Cambridge University Press, 
Jones, Richard D.P. (2013), The Creative Development of Johann Sebastian Bach, Volume II: 1717–1750: Music to Delight the Spirit. Oxford University Press,

External links

Prelude and Fugue in B minor, BWV 544 autograph facsimile at International Music Score Library Project (IMSLP).
Prelude and Fugue in B minor, BWV 544 description at Netherlands Bach Society
 Free download of BWV 544 recorded by James Kibbie on the 1724–30 Trost organ in Stadtkirche, Waltershausen, Germany

Preludes by Johann Sebastian Bach
Fugues by Johann Sebastian Bach
Compositions for organ
Compositions in B minor